James Scully  is a retired senior Australian public servant. He is best known for his time in the Australian Government trade department.

Life and career

Scully was the son of William Scully, a federal Labor MP and government minister. He studied English and History at the University of Sydney, going on to join the Australian Public Service in 1949, in the Department of Trade and Customs as a junior clerk.

Between 1961 and 1963, Scully was Assistant Trade Commissioner in Cairo. In 1967, Scully was appointed a First Assistant Secretary in the Department of Trade and Industry, heading the trade services section.

In August 1975, Scully was appointed to his first Secretary role, heading the Department of Minerals and Energy. He went on to fill the Secretary position at the Department of National Resources (1975–1977), the Department of Trade and Resources (1977–1983) and the Department of Trade (1983–1984). In 1981, he led bilateral talks on resources development with South Korea.

After retiring from the public service, Scully moved into a private sector career. He headed an independent committee advising the ACT Government on the Very Fast Train project.

For a time in the 1990s, Scully was a director at Westpac. He resigned following a September 1992 board meeting in which a loss of $1.5 billion was announced.

Awards
Scully was made an Officer of the Order of Australia in January 1984 for his public service.

References

Living people
Year of birth missing (living people)
Australian public servants
Officers of the Order of Australia
University of Sydney alumni
20th-century Australian businesspeople